Serei Mean Chey is a khum (commune) of Sampov Loun District in Battambang Province in northwestern Cambodia.

Villages

 Sralau Chrum
 Chheu Teal
 Pou Chrey
 Ou Trav Chu

References

Communes of Battambang province
Sampov Loun District